Estádio Presidente Vargas is a multi-use stadium located in Campina Grande, Brazil. It is used mostly for football matches and hosts the home matches of Treze Futebol Clube. The stadium has a maximum capacity of 12,000 people and was built in 1940.

External links
Templos do Futebol

Football venues in Paraíba
Sports venues in Paraíba
Treze Futebol Clube